Schwarzsee or Lac Noir (rarely), is a small lake in the Canton of Fribourg, Switzerland with an area of . The lake in the Swiss Prealps is bordered by the peaks of Schwyberg (1,628 m) in the West, Les Reccardets (1,923 m) and Spitzfluh (1,951 m) in the South, as well as Kaiseregg (2,185 m).

See also
Breccaschlund
List of lakes of Switzerland
List of mountain lakes of Switzerland

References

External links

 Schwarzsee.ch  tourism information

Schwarz
Lakes of the canton of Fribourg
LSchwarzsee